The Libera Award for Best Blues Record (known as Best Blues Album prior to 2021) is an award presented by the American Association of Independent Music at the annual Libera Award which recognizes "best blues album released commercially in the United States by an independent label" since 2017.

Winners and nominees

Artists that received multiple wins
2 wins
Fantastic Negrito

Artists that received multiple nominations
2 nominations
Cedric Burnside
Christone "Kingfish" Ingram
Fantastic Negrito

References

Libera Awards